This article refers to sports broadcasting contracts in Serbia. For a list of broadcasting rights in other countries, see Sports television broadcast contracts.

Football

International league and cups

UEFA
UEFA Champions League: RTS 1 (best pick on Wednesday), Arena Sport (2021-2027)
UEFA Europa League: RTS 1 (best pick, one game), Arena Sport (2021-2027)
UEFA Europa Conference League: Arena Sport (2021-2027)
UEFA Super Cup: Arena Sport (2021-2027)
UEFA Women's Champions League: DAZN (2021-2025)
UEFA Euro 2024: RTS 1
UEFA Euro 2028: RTS 1 
UEFA Euro 2024 qualifying: RTS 1 (only Serbian team), Arena Sport
UEFA Euro 2028 qualifying: RTS 1 (only Serbian team), Arena Sport
FIFA World Cup 2026 qualification (UEFA): RTS 1 (only Serbian team), Arena Sport
UEFA Nations League: RTS 1 (only Serbian team), Arena Sport (2022-2027)
UEFA Teams Friendly Matches: Arena Sport (2022-2028)
UEFA Youth League: Arena Sport (2021-2027)

CONMEBOL
Copa Libertadores: Sport Klub (2023-2026) 
Copa Sudamericana: Sport Klub (2023-2026) 
Recopa Sudamericana: Sport Klub (2023-2026) 

AFC
AFC Champions League: Sport Klub (2021-)
AFC Cup: Sport Klub (2021-)

CAF
CAF Champions League: Sport Klub (2021-)

CONCACAF
CONCACAF Champions League: Sport Klub (2020-)
CONCACAF Nations League: Sport Klub

FIFA
FIFA Club World Cup: FIFA+

Leagues

Argentina Primera Division: Arena Sport (2015-)
Australian Football League: Arena Sport (2016-)
Austrian Bundesliga: Sport Klub (2014-)
Belarusian Premier League: Sport Klub (2020-)
Belgian League: Arena Sport (2020-2025)
Bosnian Football League: Arena Sport (2019-)
Brasil Série A: Arena Sport (2020-)
Bulgarian First League: Sport Klub (2022-)
Chinese Super League: Arena Sport (2021-)
Croatian League: Arena Sport (2022-)
Czech League: Sport Klub (2021-)
Danish Superliga: Sport Klub
English Premier League: Arena Sport (2022-2028)
English Championship: Arena Sport (2022-2028)
English League One: Arena Sport (2022-2028)
English League Two: Arena Sport (2022-2028)
Estonian Meistriliiga: Sport Klub, Nova Sport (2020-)
Finnish Football League: Sport Klub, Nova Sport (2019-)
France Ligue 1: Arena Sport (2021-2024)
France Ligue 2: Arena Sport (2021-2024)
Football League of the Republika Srpska: Arena Sport (2020-), (sometimes)
German Bundesliga: Sport Klub, Nova Sport (2021-2025)
German 2. Bundesliga: Sport Klub (2021-2025)
German 3. Liga: Sport Klub (2020-)
Greece Super League: Sport Klub (2020-)
Hungarian Football League: Arena Sport (2020-)
Iceland Football League: Sport Klub, Nova Sport (2019-)
Indian Super League: Arena Sport (2022-)
Israeli Premier League: Sport Klub (2020-)
Italian Serie A: Arena Sport (2021-2024)
Italian Serie B: Sport Klub (2020-)
Japanese J1 League: Sport Klub (2016-)
Korean Football League: Arena Sport (2020-)
Latvian Football League: Sport Klub, Nova Sport (2020-)
Lithuanian Football League: Sport Klub, Nova Sport (2020-)
Macedonian Football League: Arena Sport (2019-)
Major League Soccer: Arena Sport (2019-)
Mexican Football League: Arena Sport (2020-), Sport Klub (only Chivas Guadalajara matches) (2020-)
Moldovan League: Sport Klub (2020-)
Montenegrin League: Arena Sport (2019-2021)
Netherlands Eredivise: Sport Klub (2007-)
Norwegian Eliteserien: Sport Klub (2022-)
Polish Ekstraklasa: Arena Sport (2021-)
Portuguese Primeira League: Arena Sport (2020-2023)
Romanian League: Arena Sport (2020-)
Russian Premier League: Arena Sport (2022-)
Saudi Professional League Sport Klub (2023-)
Spanish Primera League: Arena Sport (2021-2026)
Spanish Segunda League: Arena Sport (2021-2026)
Scottish Premiership: Arena Sport (2020-)
Scottish Championship: Arena Sport (2018-)
Serbian League: Arena Sport (2009-)
Serbian First League: Arena Sport (2018-) (sometimes)
Slovak Super Liga: Sport Klub (2020-)
Slovenian First League: Sport Klub
Slovenian Second League: Sport Klub
Swedish Allsvenskan: Sport Klub (2018-)
Swiss Super League: Arena Sport (2019-2022)
Turkish Super League: Sport Klub (2017-2024)
UAE Pro League: Arena Sport (2022-)
Ukrainian Premier League: Sport Klub (2011-2022)
Uruguayan Primera División: Arena Sport 
Women Bundesliga: Sport Klub (2020-)

Cups

Australian Cup: Arena Sport (only final match)
Belarusian Cup: Sport Klub (only final match)
Belgian Cup: Arena Sport (only final match)
Bosnian Cup: Arena Sport
Brazilian Cup: Arena Sport
Bulgarian Cup: Sport Klub (only final match)
Colombian Football Cup: Sport Klub
Danish Cup: Sport Klub
Dutch Cup: Sport Klub
EFL Cup: Arena Sport
EFL Trophy: Sport Klub (only final match)
Emirates Cup: Arena Sport
Estonian Cup: Sport Klub (only final match)
FA Cup: Sport Klub (2021-2024)
FA Youth Cup: Sport Klub
Florida Cup: Sport Klub
French Cup: TBA
German Cup: Arena Sport (2022-2026)
Greek Cup: Arena Sport
Israeli Football Cup: Sport Klub
Italian Cup: Arena Sport (2021-2024)
Joan Gamper Trophy: Sport Klub
Macedonian Football Cup: Arena Sport
Moldovan Cup: Sport Klub 
Montenegrin Cup: Arena Sport
Polish Cup: Arena Sport
Portuguese Cup: Sport Klub
Portuguese League Cup: Arena Sport
Romanian Cup: Sport Klub 
Russian Cup: Sport Klub
Scottish Cup: Sport Klub
Scottish League Cup: Arena Sport 
Serbian Cup: RTS 1 (only final match), Arena Sport 
Serbian Women's Cup:  Arena Sport (only final match)
SheBelieves Cup: Sport Klub
Slovak Cup: Sport Klub
Slovenian Cup: Sport Klub
Slovenian Women's Cup: Sport Klub 
Spanish Cup: Arena Sport (2022-2025)
Telekom Cup: Sport Klub
Turkish Cup: Sport Klub

Super Cups
FA Community Shield: Sport Klub (2021-2024)
Spanish Super Cup: Arena Sport (2022-2025)
Italian Super Cup: Arena Sport (2021-2024)
German Super Cup: Sport Klub (2021-2025)
French Super Cup: Arena Sport (2021-2024)
Portuguese Super Cup: Sport Klub
Dutch Super Cup: Sport Klub
Belgian Super Cup: Arena Sport
Russian Super Cup: Arena Sport (2022-)
Turkish Super Cup: Sport Klub
Croatian Super Cup: Arena Sport (2022-)
Bulgarian Supercup: Sport Klub
Saudi Super Cup: Sport Klub (2023-)

Basketball

International competitions
FIBA Basketball World Cup 2023: Sport Klub
FIBA Basketball World Cup 2023  qualification: Sport Klub
EuroBasket 2025: Sport Klub
EuroBasket 2025 qualification: Sport Klub
EuroBasket Women 2023: Sport Klub

International competitions for clubs
Euroleague: Sport Klub, Nova Sport
EuroCup: Sport Klub, Nova Sport
EuroLeague Women: Sport Klub (only Final four), FIBA YouTube channel
EuroCup Women: FIBA YouTube channel
FIBA Champions League: Arena Sport (2017-), FIBA YouTube channel
FIBA Europe Cup: FIBA YouTube channel
ABA League: Arena Sport (2015-)
ABA League Second Division: Arena Sport (2017-)
VTB United League: Arena Sport

Leagues

ACB League: Arena Sport
Australian Basketball League: Sport Klub
French Basketball League: Arena Sport 
German Basketball League: Sport Klub, Nova Sport
Greek League: Arena Sport 
Israeli Basketball League: Sport Klub
Italian Basketball League: Arena Sport (2022-)
Junior ABA League: Arena Sport (semifinals and final match) (2017-)
Lithuanian Basketball League: Sport Klub
NBA: Arena Sport (five to eight games per week) (2019-2026), NBA TV
NCAA: Arena Sport (one game per week + March Madness)
Serbian League: Arena Sport
Turkish Basketball League: Arena Sport (2022-)
Women's Basketball League of Serbia: Arena Sport (only finals match)

Cups
VTB United League Supercup: Arena Sport
ABA League Supercup: Arena Sport (2017-)
FIBA 3x3 World Tour: Sport Klub
FIBA Intercontinental Cup: Sport Klub
French Basketball League Cup: Arena Sport
German Basketball Cup: Sport Klub
Italian Basketball Cup: Arena Sport (2022-)
Italian Basketball Supercup: Arena Sport (2022-)
Lithuanian Cup: Sport Klub
Serbian Cup: Arena Sport
Serbian Women's Cup: Arena Sport (only final match)
Slovenian Basketball Cup: Sport Klub
Slovenian Basketball Supercup: Sport Klub
Spain Cup: Arena Sport
Spain Super Cup: Arena Sport
Turkish Basketball Cup: Arena Sport (2022-)
Turkish Basketball Super Cup: Arena Sport (2022-)

Tennis

ATP Challenger Tour: Sport Klub (some tournaments), Arena Sport (some tournaments)
ATP Cup: Sport Klub, Nova Sport
ATP Masters 1000: Sport Klub, RTS, Nova Sport
ATP 500: Sport Klub
ATP 250: Sport Klub (most tournaments), Arena Sport (most tournaments), Eurosport (some tournaments)
Australian Open: Eurosport
Boodles Challenge: Sport Klub
Davis Cup: Sport Klub
Fed Cup: RTS (only Serbian team)
Kooyong Classic: Arena Sport
Laver Cup: Eurosport
Next Generation ATP Finals: Sport Klub
Roland Garros: Eurosport (2021-2026)
US Open: Eurosport
Wimbledon: Sport Klub, RTS
World Tennis Championship: Sport Klub
WTA Tour: Sport Klub, Nova Sport, Eurosport (some tournaments), Arena Sport (only WTA Elite Trophy)

Motosport

British Superbike Championship: Eurosport
Blancpain GT Series Sprint Cup: Eurosport
DTM: Sport Klub
FIM Trial World Championship: Sport Klub
Euroformula Open Championship: Arena Sport
FIA Formula 2: Sport Klub
Formula 1: Sport Klub (2021-2023)
Formula E: Eurosport
FIA World Endurance Championship: Eurosport, Arena Sport
FIA World Rallycross Championship: Sport Klub
FIM Endurance World Championship: Eurosport
FIM Trial World Championship: Sport Klub
IndyCar Series: Arena Sport
Motocross World Championship: Eurosport
MotoE World Cup: Sport Klub
Moto GP: Sport Klub, Nova Sport (2010-2023)
MotoGP Rookies Cup: Sport Klub
Moto 2: Sport Klub 
Moto 3: Sport Klub
NASCAR: Sport Klub, Nova Sport
Porsche Carrera Cup: Sport Klub
Porsche Supercup: Eurosport, Sport Klub
Rally Estonia: Arena Sport
Red Bull Air Race World Championship: Arena Sport
Speedway Grand Prix: Sport Klub
Speedway of Nations: Sport Klub
Superbike World Championship: Eurosport
Supersport World Championship: Eurosport
TCR Touring Car: Sport Klub
WRC: Arena Sport
W Series: Arena Sport
WTCC: Eurosport
X Games: Arena Sport

American Football

NCAA College Football: Arena Sport
NFL: Arena Sport (2023-)
Serbian National League: Sport Klub

Handball

International competitions
European Handball Championship 2024: Arena Sport

International competitions for clubs
Men's EHF Champions League: Arena Sport
Women's EHF Champions League: Arena Sport
SEHA League: Arena Sport, RTS

Leagues
France League: Arena Sport
German Bundesliga: Arena Sport
Serbian Handball Super League: RTS, Arena Sport
Serbian Super League of Handball for Women: RTS, Arena Sport
Hungary Handball League: Sport Klub
Slovenian First League of Handball: Sport Klub

Cups
 Serbian Handball Super Cup: RTS, Arena Sport
 Serbian Handball Super Cup for Women: RTS, Arena Sport
German Cup: Arena Sport 
German Super Cup: Arena Sport
Hungarian Handball Cup: Sport Klub (only final match)
Slovenian Supercup: Sport Klub

Volleyball

International competitions
FIVB Men's Nations League: Sport Klub
FIVB Women's Nations League: Sport Klub

International competitions for clubs
Men's CEV Champions League: Arena Sport
Women's CEV Champions League: Arena Sport
Men's CEV Cup: Arena Sport
Women's CEV Cup: Arena Sport
Men's CEV Challenge Cup: Arena Sport
Women's CEV Challenge Cup: Arena Sport

Leagues
German Women's Volleyball League: Sport Klub
Greece Volleyball League: Sport Klub, Nova Sport
Italian Volleyball League: Sport Klub
Italian Women's Volleyball League: Sport Klub
Polish Women's Volleyball League: Sport Klub
Russian Volleyball Super League: Arena Sport
Russian Women's Volleyball Super League: Arena Sport
Slovenian Volleyball League: Sport Klub (sometimes)
Volleyball League of Serbia: RTS
Women's Volleyball League of Serbia: RTS
Turkish Men's Volleyball League: Sport Klub
Turkish Women's Volleyball League: Sport Klub, Nova Sport

Cups
Italian Men's Cup: Sport Klub
Italian Volleyball Super Cup: Sport Klub
Italian Women's Cup: Sport Klub
Italian Women's Super Cup: Sport Klub
Turkish Men's Cup: Sport Klub
Turkish Men's Super Cup: Sport Klub
Turkish Women's Cup: Sport Klub
Turkish Women's Super Cup: Sport Klub
Serbian Men's Super Cup: RTS
Serbian Women's Super Cup: RTS

Ice Hockey

Leagues
CHL: Arena Sport (selected games)
KHL: Arena Sport
NHL: Sport Klub
NCAA Ice Hockey: Arena Sport (only final match)

Cups
Spengler Cup: Arena Sport

Cycling
Cape Epic: Sport Klub
Critérium du Dauphiné: Eurosport
Giro d'Italia: Eurosport
Italian Cycling Cup: Eurosport
Six-day racing: Eurosport 
Tour of Croatia: Eurosport, Sport Klub 
Tour de France: Eurosport 
Tour de Suisse: Arena Sport
Tour of California: Eurosport
Tour of Turkey: Eurosport
UCI Road World Championships: Eurosport
Vuelta a España: Eurosport
Vuelta a San Juan: Eurosport

Rugby
Rugby World Cup: Arena Sport
Rugby Championship: Arena Sport
European Rugby Challenge Cup: Arena Sport
European Rugby Champions Cup: Arena Sport
Pro14: Arena Sport
Six Nations Championship: Arena Sport

Winter Sports
Biathlon World Cup: Eurosport
Bobsleigh World Cup: Arena Sport
FIS Alpine Ski World Cup: Eurosport
FIS Cross-Country World Cup: Eurosport
FIS Freestyle Skiing World Cup: Eurosport
FIS Nordic Combined World Cup: Eurosport
FIS Snowboard World Cup: Eurosport
FIS Ski Jumping World Cup: Eurosport
ISU Grand Prix of Figure Skating: Arena Sport
Luge World Cup: Eurosport

Water Polo
Regional League: Arena Sport, RTS
LEN Champions League: Sport Klub
LEN Euro Cup: Sport Klub
Serbian Water Polo League: Arena Sport
Serbian Water Polo Cup: Arena Sport, RTS
Serbian Water Polo Cup for Women: RTS, Arena Sport

Athletics
Artistic Gymnastics World Cup: Arena Sport
Diamond League: Sport Klub
Drake Relays: Arena Sport
ISTAF Indoor: Arena Sport
Millrose Games: Arena Sport
World Indoor Tour: Arena Sport
World Marathon Majors: Arena Sport, Sport Klub, Eurosport
World Challenge: Arena Sport
World Relays: Arena Sport
World Triathlon Series: Arena Sport
USA Outdoor Track and Field Championships: Arena Sport

Baseball
 MLB: Arena Sport (1-2 games per week, playoffs)

Beach Volleyball
European Beach Volleyball Championships: Arena Sport
FIVB Beach Volleyball World Tour: Arena Sport

Pool billiards
Snooker: Eurosport, Sport Klub
World Cup of Pool: Sport Klub

Fight sports
Bushido MMA: DAZN: October 2022 to October 2025, all fights
Cage Warriors: Sport Klub
Dream Boxing: DAZN: October 2022 to October 2025, all fights
Glory: Arena Sport
Golden Boy: DAZN
King of Kings: DAZN: October 2022 to October 2025, all fights
Matchroom: DAZN

Aquatics
Clipper Round the World: Sport Klub
Formula 1 Powerboat: Sport Klub
FINA Swimming World Cup: Arena Sport
FINA Diving World Series: Arena Sport
Mare Nostrum: Arena Sport
Red Bull Cliff Diving World Series: Arena Sport

Futsal

International league and cups
UEFA Women's Futsal Championship: Sport Klub (semifinals and final match)
UEFA Futsal Champions League: Arena Sport (semifinals and final match)

Leagues
Belarusian Futsal Premier League: Arena Sport
Brasil Futsal League: Sport Klub, Nova Sport
Primera División: Arena Sport
Slovenian Futsal League: Sport Klub (only final matches)

Cups
Italian Futsal Cup: Sport Klub 
Slovenian Futsal Cup: Sport Klub (only final match)
Spanish Futsal Super Cup: Arena Sport

Golf
Ladies Professional Golf Association: Sport Klub
PGA Tour: Sport Klub, Eurosport

Table Tennis
European Champions League: Arena Sport

Sport Channels

Arena Channels Group
Arena Sport Premium 1 (FHD 1080i)
Arena Sport Premium 2 (FHD 1080i)
Arena Sport Premium 3 (FHD 1080i)
Arena Sport 1 (FHD 1080i)
Arena Sport 2 (FHD 1080i)
Arena Sport 3 (FHD 1080i)
Arena Sport 4 (FHD 1080i)
Arena Sport 5 (FHD 1080i)
Arena Sport 6 (FHD 1080i)
Arena Sport 7 (FHD 1080i)
Arena Sport 8 (FHD 1080i)
Arena Sport 9 (FHD 1080i)
Arena Sport 10 (FHD 1080i)
Arena Sport 1x2 (FHD 1080i)
Arena Esport (FHD 1080i)
Arena Fight (FHD 1080i)

United Group Channels
Nova Sport (FHD 1080i)
Sport Klub 1 (FHD 1080i)
Sport Klub 2 (FHD 1080i)
Sport Klub 3 (FHD 1080i)
Sport Klub 4 (FHD 1080i)
Sport Klub 5 (FHD 1080i)
Sport Klub 6 (FHD 1080i)
Sport Klub 7 (FHD 1080i)
Sport Klub 8 (FHD 1080i)
Sport Klub 9 (FHD 1080i)
Sport Klub 10 (FHD 1080i)
Sport Klub HD (FHD 1080i)
Sport Klub Golf (FHD 1080i)
Sport Klub Esport (FHD 1080i)
Sport Klub 4K (UHD 2160i)
Sport Klub Fight (SD)
Lov i ribolov (SD)

Discovery Channels
Eurosport 1 (FHD 1080i)
Eurosport 2 (FHD 1080i)
Eurosport 4K (UHD 2160i)

Other Channels
Zvezda TV (FHD 1080i)
Partizan TV (FHD 1080i)
NBA TV (FHD 1080i)
Liverpool TV (FHD 1080i)
Fight Network (FHD 1080i)
Kuvo TV (FHD 1080i)
SOS PLUS (SD)
Extreme Sports Channel (SD)
Motorvision TV (FHD 1080i)
Trace Sport Stars (FHD 1080i)
Outdoor Channel (FHD 1080i)
FightBox (SD)
Fast and Fun Box (FHD 1080i)
Telebet (SD)
M4 Sport (FHD 1080i)

References

Serbia
Television in Serbia